Uasi Vi Kohinoa (born 13 August 1961) is a Tongan weightlifter. He competed in the men's middleweight event at the 1992 Summer Olympics.

References

External links
 

1961 births
Living people
Tongan male weightlifters
Olympic weightlifters of Tonga
Weightlifters at the 1992 Summer Olympics
Place of birth missing (living people)